

400001–400100 

|-bgcolor=#f2f2f2
| colspan=4 align=center | 
|}

400101–400200 

|-id=193
| 400193 Castión ||  || The city of Castiglione dei Pepoli (also known as "Castión") is a medieval fiefdom of the Pepoli noble family, in the Bolognese Apennines, Italy. The second discoverer has lived there for many years. || 
|}

400201–400300 

|-bgcolor=#f2f2f2
| colspan=4 align=center | 
|}

400301–400400 

|-id=308
| 400308 Antonkutter ||  || Anton Kutter (1903–1985), a German engineer, film director, screenwriter and amateur astronomer. || 
|-id=309
| 400309 Ralfhofner ||  || Ralf Hofner (1960–2014), a German amateur astronomer and founder of one of the biggest European Star Parties, located near Herzberg, Brandenburg. || 
|}

400401–400500 

|-bgcolor=#f2f2f2
| colspan=4 align=center | 
|}

400501–400600 

|-bgcolor=#f2f2f2
| colspan=4 align=center | 
|}

400601–400700 

|-id=673
| 400673 Vitapolunina ||  || Viktoriya (Vita) Polunina (born 1967), Professor Doctor of medical sciences, is a specialist in reflex therapy in children, reconstructive and sports medicine, therapeuticphysical training, and the author of more than 70 scientific papers. || 
|}

400701–400800 

|-id=796
| 400796 Douglass ||  || Frederick Douglass (c. 1818–1895) was an American born into slavery who became a leading abolitionist and supporter of women's rights. Through his writings and speeches, he tirelessly fought slavery. He advised presidents, served in government, and pushed for equal protection of all under the law. || 
|}

400801–400900 

|-id=811
| 400811 Gillesfontaine ||  || Gilles Fontaine (1948–2019) was a Canadian astrophysicist at the Universite de Montreal. He made fundamental and lasting contributions to our knowledge of white dwarf interiors, evolution and pulsations. He was an inspiring teacher and mentor, who has trained a new generation of leaders in the field. || 
|-id=881
| 400881 Vladimírdolinay ||  || Vladimír Dolinay (1981–2020) was a Slovak teacher, civic and local activist, promoter of education and an advocate for building bridges between Slovakia and Slovak minorities abroad, especially in Romania, where he worked as a teacher. He was also an enthusiastic supporter of the project to build a planetarium in Bratislava. || 
|}

400901–401000 

|-bgcolor=#f2f2f2
| colspan=4 align=center | 
|}

References 

400001-401000